Buckingham is an unincorporated community and census-designated place (CDP) in Lee County, Florida, United States. The population was 4,443 at the 2020 census, up from 4,036 at the 2010 census. It is part of the Cape Coral-Fort Myers, Florida Metropolitan Statistical Area.

Historic Buckingham School is located there.

Geography
Buckingham is located in northeastern Lee County at  (26.6592, -81.7343). It is bordered to the southwest by Fort Myers, the county seat, and to the south and east by unincorporated Lehigh Acres.

Demographics

As of the census of 2000, there were 3,742 people, 1,283 households, and 1,008 families residing in the CDP. The racial makeup of the CDP was 94.20% White, 2.32% African American, 0.19% Native American, 0.51% Asian, 1.92% from other races, and 0.86% from two or more races. Hispanic or Latino of any race were 4.68% of the population.

There were 1,283 households, out of which 31.0% had children under the age of 18 living with them, 67.3% were married couples living together, 6.4% had a female householder with no husband present, and 21.4% were non-families. 15.0% of all households were made up of individuals, and 5.0% had someone living alone who was 65 years of age or older.  The average household size was 2.67 and the average family size was 2.93.

In the CDP, the population was spread out, with 20.9% under the age of 18, 5.2% from 18 to 24, 32.9% from 25 to 44, 30.7% from 45 to 64, and 10.3% who were 65 years of age or older.  The median age was 41 years. For every 100 females, there were 109.2 males.  For every 100 females age 18 and over, there were 110.6 males.

The median income for a household in the CDP was $51,068, and the median income for a family was $55,719. Males had a median income of $33,176 versus $25,676 for females. The per capita income for the CDP was $19,103.  About 6.4% of families and 16.8% of the population were below the poverty line, including 11.8% of those under age 18 and 8.8% of those age 65 or over.

Notable people
John Ashley- outlaw and occasional pirate active in southern Florida during the 1910s and 1920s.

References

Census-designated places in Lee County, Florida
Census-designated places in Florida